Obo Airport  is an airport in Obo, Papua New Guinea.

Airlines and destinations

References

External links
 

Airports in Papua New Guinea
Western Province (Papua New Guinea)